Get Loose is the fifth studio album from American singer Evelyn King, released by RCA Records in August 1982. It was produced by Morrie Brown with Kashif and Paul Lawrence Jones III as assistant producers.

History
The album peaked at number-one on the R&B albums chart. It also reached #27 on the Billboard 200. It produced the hit singles "Love Come Down", "Betcha She Don't Love You", "Back to Love", and "Get Loose". The album was certified gold by the RIAA. The album was digitally remastered and reissued on CD with bonus tracks in 2010 by Big Break Records and Sony Music Legacy.

Track listing

Reception
Phyl Garland of Stereo Review complimented the sound quality, calling it "good" but was disenchanted with the album's content and felt its success was "[an] indication of the pitifully  limited taste of youngsters addicted to junk music. The heavy beat, underscoring such lyrics as 'Ooh, you make my love come down,' is supposed to incite a desire to dance, but this treatment is about as exciting as an unwashed sock. Both the tunes and lyrics (if you can call them that) sound as if they were written by a computer programmed to churn out mindless cliches. She is good enough to make me almost like the better items here, Betcha She Don't Love You, Stop That, I'm Just Warmin' Up. Otherwise listening to this album is like being trapped inside one of those portable noise machines that culturally stunted kids tote through the streets. Performance: too programmed, recording: Good."

Chart performance

Singles

See also
List of number-one R&B albums of 1982 (U.S.)

References

External links

1982 albums
Evelyn "Champagne" King albums
RCA Records albums